Der Untertan (literally "the underling", translated into English under the titles Man of Straw, The Patrioteer, and The Loyal Subject) is one of the best known novels of German author Heinrich Mann. The title character, Diederich Hessling, a dedicated 'Untertan' in the sense of a person subservient to a monarch or prince, is an immoral man who is meant to serve as an allegory of both the reign of Kaiser Wilhelm II and German society of his time.

The novel was completed during the July Crisis in 1914, shortly before the outbreak of World War I. Extracts had been published in the satirical magazine Simplicissimus from 1912 onwards, causing great controversy. A book edition was not published until 1918 by Kurt Wolff in Leipzig.

Plot
The socio-critical novel portrays the life of Diederich Hessling, a slavish and fanatical admirer of Kaiser Wilhelm II, as an archetype of Wilhelmine Germany. The name "Hessling" alludes to the German word for ugly, "". Hessling is unthinkingly obedient to authority and maintains a rigid dedication to the nationalist goals of the newly created Second Reich.

As a self-conscious and snivelling child, he acts as an informer. He later gains self-confidence by joining a duelling student fraternity, practising as a drunkard and Stammtisch agitator, and by narrowly obtaining a doctorate of chemistry. He becomes a paper manufacturer, family patriarch, and eventually the most influential man in his small town.

Throughout the novel, Hessling's inflexible ideals are often contradicted by his actions: he preaches bravery but is a coward; he is the strongest militarist but seeks to be excused from conscription; his greatest political opponents are the Marxist Social Democratic Party of Germany (SPD), yet he uses his influence to help get his hometown's SPD candidate to the Reichstag parliament, in order to defeat his liberal business competitors; he starts vicious rumors against the latter and then dissociates himself from them; he both preaches and enforces Christian morality against others but lies, cheats, and regularly commits adultery.

The plot ends with the solemn inauguration of an Emperor William monument, with Hessling delivering the speech, which is abruptly terminated by an apocalyptic thunderstorm. He also faces the death of Buck, an elderly veteran of the democratic 1848 Revolution.

Themes
Diederich's ideals: blood and iron, and the might of opulent power, are exposed as hollowness and weakness. He is an allegory depicting and satirizing the German people's increasing susceptibility to militarism, ultra-nationalism, anti-Semitism, and colonialism. His character is often juxtaposed, in both words and appearance to Kaiser Wilhelm II. In one instance, Hessling's behavior and outward appearance move an observer to stammer,  'It almost seems to me...You look so very much like His ...' , meaning the Kaiser.

Mann uses the moral bankruptcy and shallow ridiculousness of Hessling's life to critique both Wilhelminism and the German culture of the period.  Like other German novels of the era, such as Theodor Fontane's Effi Briest, or even his brother Thomas Mann's Buddenbrooks, the principal target is the hypocrisy of the middle class and the risk of social collapse in a nation of loyal 'Untertan' citizens. Thomas Mann, however, rejected the work as "heinous aestheticism", while Kurt Tucholsky praised it as the "herbarium of the German man". The novel is frequently read in German schools up to today.

Adaptation
A lithograph named Der Untertan was created by Karl Hubbuch in 1923.

In East Germany, the book was made into the 1951 DEFA film Der Untertan (released in English as The Kaiser's Lackey), directed by Wolfgang Staudte and starring Werner Peters as Diederich Hessling. It received the National Prize of the German Democratic Republic and initially was banned in West Germany until a shortened version was released in 1957. A radio drama was produced by the public Westdeutscher Rundfunk broadcaster in 1971.

The BBC adapted the book for a six-part TV mini-series Man of Straw, broadcast in 1972, with Derek Jacobi as Hessling.

References

External links

 The Patrioteer. Full 1921 English translation at Google Books
 Man of Straw. Penguin Books, London, 1984, c1918.
 
 

1918 German-language novels
German novels adapted into films
German novels adapted into television shows